Melvin Beaunorus Tolson (February 6, 1898 – August 29, 1966) was an American poet, educator, columnist, and politician.  As a poet, he was influenced both by Modernism and the language and experiences of African Americans, and he was deeply influenced by his study of the Harlem Renaissance.

As a debate coach at the historically black Wiley College in Marshall, Texas, Tolson led a team that pioneered interracial college debates against white colleges in the segregated South. This work was depicted in 2007 biopic The Great Debaters, produced by Oprah Winfrey and starring and directed by Denzel Washington as Tolson.

Early life and education 
Born in Moberly, Missouri, Tolson was one of four children of Reverend Alonzo Tolson, a Methodist minister, and Lera (Hurt) Tolson, a seamstress of African-Creek ancestry. Alonzo Tolson was also of mixed race, the son of an enslaved woman and her white master.  He served at various churches in the Missouri and Iowa area until settling longer in Kansas City.  Reverend Tolson studied throughout his life to add to the limited education he had first received, even taking Latin, Greek and Hebrew by correspondence courses. Both parents emphasized education for their children.

Melvin Tolson graduated from Lincoln High School in Kansas City in 1919.  He enrolled at Fisk University but transferred to Lincoln University, Pennsylvania the next year for financial reasons.  Tolson graduated with honors in 1923.  He became a Man of The Omega Psi Phi fraternity.

Marriage and family 
In 1922, Melvin Tolson married Ruth Southall of Charlottesville, Virginia, whom he had met as a student at Lincoln University.  Their first child was Melvin Beaunorus Tolson, Jr., who, as an adult, became a professor at the University of Oklahoma.  He was followed by Arthur Lincoln, who as an adult became a professor at Southern University; Wiley Wilson; and Ruth Marie Tolson.  All children were born by 1928.

Career 
After graduation, Tolson and his wife moved to Marshall, Texas, where he taught speech and English at Wiley College (1924–1947).  The small, historically black Methodist Episcopal college had a high reputation among blacks in the South and Tolson became one of its stars.

In 1930–31 Tolson took a leave of absence from teaching to study for a Master's degree at Columbia University.  His thesis project, "The Harlem Group of Negro Writers," was based on his extensive interviews with members of the Harlem Renaissance.  His poetry was strongly influenced by his time in New York.  He completed his work and was awarded the master's degree in 1940.

In addition to teaching English, Tolson used his high energies in several directions at Wiley.  He built an award-winning debate team, the Wiley Forensic Society, which became a pioneer in interracial collegiate debates. Beginning in 1930, the team debated against law students from the University of Michigan in Chicago; then, in 1931, it participated in the first known interracial collegiate debate in the South, against Oklahoma City University. During their tour in 1935, they competed against the University of Southern California, which they defeated.  There he also co-founded the black intercollegiate Southern Association of Dramatic and Speech Arts, and directed the theater club. In addition, he coached the junior varsity football team.

Tolson mentored students such as James Farmer and Heman Sweatt, who later became civil rights activists.  He encouraged his students not only to be well-rounded people but also to stand up for their rights. This was a controversial position in the segregated U.S. South of the early and mid-20th century.

In 1947 Tolson began teaching at Langston University, a historically black college in Langston, Oklahoma, where he worked for the next 17 years.  He was a dramatist and director of the Dust Bowl Theater at the university.  One of his students at Langston was Nathan Hare, the black studies pioneer who became the founding publisher of the journal The Black Scholar.

In 1947 Liberia appointed Tolson its Poet Laureate.  In 1953 he completed a major epic poem in honor of the nation's centennial, the Libretto for the Republic of Liberia.

Tolson entered local politics and served three terms as mayor of Langston, Oklahoma from 1954 to 1960.

In 1947, Tolson was accused of having been active in organizing farm laborers and tenant farmers during the late 1930s (though the nature of his activities is unclear) and of having radical leftist associations.

Tolson was a man of impressive intellect who created poetry that was "funny, witty, humoristic, slapstick, rude, cruel, bitter, and hilarious," as reviewer Karl Shapiro described the Harlem Gallery.  The poet Langston Hughes described him as "no highbrow. Students revere him and love him. Kids from the cotton fields like him. Cow punchers understand him ... He's a great talker."

In 1965, Tolson was appointed to a two-year term at Tuskegee Institute, where he was Avalon Poet. He died after cancer surgery in Dallas, Texas, on August 29, 1966. He was buried in Guthrie, Oklahoma.

Literary works 
From 1930 on, Tolson began writing poetry. He also wrote two plays by 1937, although he did not continue to work in this genre.

From October 1937 to June 1944, Tolson wrote a column for The Washington Tribune, which he called "Cabbage and Caviar".

In 1941, he published his poem "Dark Symphony" in the Atlantic Monthly. Some critics believe it is his greatest work, in which he compared and contrasted African-American and European-American history.

In 1944 Tolson published his first poetry collection, Rendezvous with America, which includes Dark Symphony.  He was especially interested in historic events which had fallen into obscurity.

Tolson's Libretto for the Republic of Liberia (1953), another major work, is in the form of an epic poem in an eight-part, rhapsodic sequence.  It is considered a major modernist work.

Tolson's final work to appear in his lifetime, the long poem Harlem Gallery, was published in 1965.  The poem consists of several sections, each beginning with a letter of the Greek alphabet.  The poem concentrates on African-American life.  It was a striking change from his first works, and was composed in a jazz style with quick changes and intellectually dense, rich allusions.

In 1979 a collection of Tolson's poetry was published posthumously, entitled A Gallery of Harlem Portraits.  These were poems written during his year in New York.  They represented a mixture of various styles, including short narratives in free verse.  This collection was influenced by the loose form of Edgar Lee Masters' Spoon River Anthology.  An urban, racially diverse and culturally rich community is presented in A Gallery of Harlem Portraits.

With increasing interest in Tolson and his literary period, in 1999 the University of Virginia published a collection of his poetry entitled Harlem Gallery and Other Poems of Melvin B. Tolson, edited by Raymond Nelson.

Tolson's papers are housed at the Library of Congress.

Legacy and honors 
 Fellowship to Columbia University, 1930–31.
 1947, Liberia named Tolson its poet laureate.
 1954, appointed permanent fellow in poetry and drama at the Bread Loaf Writers' Conference at Middlebury College in Middlebury, Vermont.
 1964, elected to the New York Herald Tribune book-review board, and the District of Columbia presented him with a citation and Award for Cultural Achievement in the Fine Arts.
 1964, grant from the National Institute.
 1966, annual poetry award of the American Academy of Arts and Letters.
 1970, Langston University founded the Melvin B. Tolson Black Heritage Center in his honor, to collect material of Africans, African Americans, and the African diaspora.
 2004, inducted posthumously into Oklahoma Higher Education Hall of Fame.
 2007, a biographical film, The Great Debaters, was released.

See also 

The Great Debaters
Inspirational/motivational instructors/mentors portrayed in films
List of poets from the United States

References

Further reading

External links 
Literary Encyclopedia – in progress
Biography of Tolson from the Marshall News Messenger

1898 births
1966 deaths
People from Moberly, Missouri
People from the Kansas City metropolitan area
Fisk University alumni
Langston University faculty
Lincoln University (Pennsylvania) alumni
People from Marshall, Texas
African-American mayors in Oklahoma
20th-century American poets
African-American poets
African-American people in Oklahoma politics
Columbia University alumni
Muscogee people
Wiley College faculty
20th-century American politicians
20th-century African-American writers
20th-century Native Americans